Henry Mitchell (1784January 12, 1856) was an American physician and politician who served one term as a United States representative from New York.

Biography 
He was the son of John Mitchell and Elizabeth Sherman (daughter of Rev. Josiah Sherman and Martha Minott); she was the niece of founding father Roger Sherman and the sister of Roger Minott Sherman.

Mitchell was born in Woodbury, Connecticut in 1784. He pursued classical studies under private tutors and graduated from the medical department of Yale College in 1804. He engaged in the practice of medicine in Norwich, New York.

Political career 
He became a member of the New York State Assembly in 1827; elected as a Jacksonian to the 23rd United States Congress (March 4, 1833 – March 3, 1835).

Later career and death 
After his term in office, he resumed the practice of medicine; died in Norwich, New York on January 12, 1856; interment in Mount Hope Cemetery.

External links
 
Henry Mitchell Family Tree
Henry Sherman Family Papers
Roger Minott Sherman Papers
DAR Helen Garvin Foote
Henry's Wife Rowena Wales Mitchell Tree
Henry Mitchell Find A Grave

1784 births
1856 deaths
Members of the New York State Assembly
Yale College alumni
Jacksonian members of the United States House of Representatives from New York (state)
19th-century American politicians
People from Woodbury, Connecticut

Members of the United States House of Representatives from New York (state)